In mathematics, the binomial coefficients are the positive integers that occur as coefficients in the binomial theorem. Commonly, a binomial coefficient is indexed by a pair of integers  and is written  It is the coefficient of the  term in the polynomial expansion of the binomial power ; this coefficient can be computed by the multiplicative formula

which using factorial notation can be compactly expressed as

and the binomial coefficient  is the coefficient of the  term.

Arranging the numbers  in successive rows for  gives a triangular array called Pascal's triangle, satisfying the recurrence relation

The binomial coefficients occur in many areas of mathematics, and especially in combinatorics. The symbol  is usually read as " choose " because there are  ways to choose an (unordered) subset of  elements from a fixed set of  elements. For example, there are  ways to choose 2 elements from  namely  and 

History and notation
Andreas von Ettingshausen introduced the notation  in 1826, although the numbers were known centuries earlier (see Pascal's triangle). In about 1150, the Indian mathematician Bhaskaracharya gave an exposition of binomial coefficients in his book Līlāvatī.

Many calculators use variants of the  because they can represent it on a single-line display.

Definition and interpretations 

The same coefficient also occurs (if ) in the binomial formula

(valid for any elements x, y of a commutative ring),
which explains the name "binomial coefficient".

Another occurrence of this number is in combinatorics, where it gives the number of ways, disregarding order, that k objects can be chosen from among n objects; more formally, the number of k-element subsets (or k-combinations) of an n-element set. This number can be seen as equal to the one of the first definition, independently of any of the formulas below to compute it: if in each of the n factors of the power  one temporarily labels the term X with an index i (running from 1 to n), then each subset of k indices gives after expansion a contribution Xk, and the coefficient of that monomial in the result will be the number of such subsets. This shows in particular that  is a natural number for any natural numbers n and k. Most of these interpretations are easily seen to be equivalent to counting k-combinations.

Computing the value of binomial coefficients 

Several methods exist to compute the value of  without actually expanding a binomial power or counting k-combinations.

Recursive formula 
One method uses the recursive, purely additive formula
 for all integers  such that 

with initial/boundary values
 for all integers 

The formula follows from considering the set  and counting separately (a) the k-element groupings that include a particular set element, say "i", in every group (since "i" is already chosen to fill one spot in every group, we need only choose  from the remaining ) and (b) all the k-groupings that don't include "i"; this enumerates all the possible k-combinations of n elements. This recursive formula then allows the construction of Pascal's triangle, surrounded by white spaces where the zeros, or the trivial coefficients, would be.

Multiplicative formula 
A more efficient method to compute individual binomial coefficients is given by the formula

where the numerator of the first fraction  is expressed as a falling factorial power.
This formula is easiest to understand for the combinatorial interpretation of binomial coefficients.
The numerator gives the number of ways to select a sequence of k distinct objects, retaining the order of selection, from a set of n objects. The denominator counts the number of distinct sequences that define the same k-combination when order is disregarded.

Factorial formula 
Finally, though computationally unsuitable, there is the compact form, often used in proofs and derivations, which makes repeated use of the familiar factorial function:

where n! denotes the factorial of n. It is less practical for explicit computation (in the case that k is small and n is large) unless common factors are first cancelled (in particular since factorial values grow very rapidly). The formula does exhibit a symmetry that is less evident from the multiplicative formula (though it is from the definitions)

which leads to a more efficient multiplicative computational routine. Using the falling factorial notation,

Generalization and connection to the binomial series 

The multiplicative formula allows the definition of binomial coefficients to be extended by replacing n by an arbitrary number α (negative, real, complex) or even an element of any commutative ring in which all positive integers are invertible:

With this definition one has a generalization of the binomial formula (with one of the variables set to 1), which justifies still calling the  binomial coefficients:

This formula is valid for all complex numbers α and X with |X| < 1. It can also be interpreted as an identity of formal power series in X, where it actually can serve as definition of arbitrary powers of power series with constant coefficient equal to 1; the point is that with this definition all identities hold that one expects for exponentiation, notably

However, for other values of α, including negative integers and rational numbers, the series is really infinite.

Pascal's triangle 

Pascal's rule is the important recurrence relation

which can be used to prove by mathematical induction that  is a natural number for all integer n ≥ 0 and all integer k, a fact that is not immediately obvious from formula (1). To the left and right of Pascal's triangle, the entries (shown as blanks) are all zero.

Pascal's rule also gives rise to Pascal's triangle:
 

It is constructed by first placing 1s in the outermost positions, and then filling each inner position with the sum of the two numbers directly above. This method allows the quick calculation of binomial coefficients without the need for fractions or multiplications. For instance, by looking at row number 5 of the triangle, one can quickly read off that

Combinatorics and statistics 
Binomial coefficients are of importance in combinatorics, because they provide ready formulas for certain frequent counting problems:
 There are  ways to choose k elements from a set of n elements. See Combination.
 There are  ways to choose k elements from a set of n elements if repetitions are allowed. See Multiset.
 There are  strings containing k ones and n zeros.
 There are  strings consisting of k ones and n zeros such that no two ones are adjacent.
 The Catalan numbers are 
 The binomial distribution in statistics is

Binomial coefficients as polynomials 
For any nonnegative integer k, the expression  can be simplified and defined as a polynomial divided by :

this presents a polynomial in t with rational coefficients.

As such, it can be evaluated at any real or complex number t to define binomial coefficients with such first arguments. These "generalized binomial coefficients" appear in Newton's generalized binomial theorem.

Its coefficients are expressible in terms of Stirling numbers of the first kind:

The derivative of  can be calculated by logarithmic differentiation:

Binomial coefficients as a basis for the space of polynomials 
Over any field of characteristic 0 (that is, any field that contains the rational numbers), each polynomial p(t) of degree at most d is uniquely expressible as a linear combination  of binomial coefficients. The coefficient ak is the kth difference of the sequence p(0), p(1), ..., p(k). Explicitly,

Integer-valued polynomials 

Each polynomial  is integer-valued: it has an integer value at all integer inputs . (One way to prove this is by induction on k, using Pascal's identity.) Therefore, any integer linear combination of binomial coefficient polynomials is integer-valued too. Conversely, shows that any integer-valued polynomial is an integer linear combination of these binomial coefficient polynomials. More generally, for any subring R of a characteristic 0 field K, a polynomial in K[t] takes values in R at all integers if and only if it is an R-linear combination of binomial coefficient polynomials.

Example 
The integer-valued polynomial  can be rewritten as

Identities involving binomial coefficients 
The factorial formula facilitates relating nearby binomial coefficients. For instance, if k is a positive integer and n is arbitrary, then

and, with a little more work,

We can also get

Moreover, the following may be useful:

For constant n, we have the following recurrence:

To sum up, we have

Sums of the binomial coefficients 
The formula

says the elements in the th row of Pascal's triangle always add up to 2 raised to the th power. This is obtained from the binomial theorem by setting x = 1 and y = 1. The formula also has a natural combinatorial interpretation: the left side sums the number of subsets of {1, ..., n} of sizes k = 0, 1, ..., n, giving the total number of subsets. (That is, the left side counts the power set of {1, ..., n}.) However, these subsets can also be generated by successively choosing or excluding each element 1, ..., n; the n independent binary choices (bit-strings) allow a total of  choices. The left and right sides are two ways to count the same collection of subsets, so they are equal.

The formulas

and

The Chu–Vandermonde identity, which holds for any complex values m and n and any non-negative integer k, is

When , equation reduces to equation. In the special case , using, the expansion becomes (as seen in Pascal's triangle at right)

where the term on the right side is a central binomial coefficient.

Another form of the Chu–Vandermonde identity, which applies for any integers j, k, and n satisfying , is

The proof is similar, but uses the binomial series expansion with negative integer exponents.
When , equation gives the hockey-stick identity

and its relative

Let F(n) denote the n-th Fibonacci number.
Then

This can be proved by induction using or by Zeckendorf's representation. A combinatorial proof is given below.

Multisections of sums 
For integers s and t such that  series multisection gives the following identity for the sum of binomial coefficients:
 

For small , these series have particularly nice forms; for example,

Partial sums 
Although there is no closed formula for partial sums

with special case

for n > 0. This latter result is also a special case of the result from the theory of finite differences that for any polynomial P(x) of degree less than n,

Differentiating k times and setting x = −1 yields this for
,
when 0 ≤ k < n,
and the general case follows by taking linear combinations of these.

When P(x) is of degree less than or equal to n,

where  is the coefficient of degree n in P(x).

where m and d are complex numbers.

The series  is convergent for k ≥ 2. This formula is used in the analysis of the German tank problem.

Identities with combinatorial proofs 
Many identities involving binomial coefficients can be proved by combinatorial means. For example, for nonnegative integers , the identity

(which reduces to  when q = 1) can be given a double counting proof, as follows. The left side counts the number of ways of selecting a subset of [n] = {1, 2, ..., n} with at least q elements, and marking q elements among those selected.

In Pascal's identity

both sides count the number of k-element subsets of [n]: the two terms on the right side group them into those that contain element n and those that do not.

The identity also has a combinatorial proof. The identity reads

Suppose you have  empty squares arranged in a row and you want to mark (select) n of them. There are  ways to do this. On the other hand, you may select your n squares by selecting k squares from among the first n and  squares from the remaining n squares; any k from 0 to n will work. This gives

Now apply to get the result.

If one denotes by  the sequence of Fibonacci numbers, indexed so that , then the identity

has the following combinatorial proof. On the other hand, if such a tiling uses exactly  of the  tiles, then it uses  of the  tiles, and so uses  tiles total. There are  ways to order these tiles, and so summing this coefficient over all possible values of  gives the identity.

Sum of coefficients row 

The number of k-combinations for all k, is the sum of the nth row (counting from 0) of the binomial coefficients.

Dixon's identity 
Dixon's identity is

or, more generally,

where a, b, and c are non-negative integers.

Continuous identities 
Certain trigonometric integrals have values expressible in terms of binomial coefficients: For any 

 
 
 

These can be proved by using Euler's formula to convert trigonometric functions to complex exponentials, expanding using the binomial theorem, and integrating term by term.

Congruences 
If n is prime, then  for every k with 
More generally, this remains true if n is any number and k is such that all the numbers between 1 and k are coprime to n.

Indeed, we have

Generating functions

Ordinary generating functions 
For a fixed , the ordinary generating function of the sequence  is
 

For a fixed , the ordinary generating function of the sequence  is
 

The bivariate generating function of the binomial coefficients is
 

A symmetric bivariate generating function of the binomial coefficients is
 

which is the same as the previous generating function after the substitution .

Exponential generating function 
A symmetric exponential bivariate generating function of the binomial coefficients is:

Divisibility properties 

In 1852, Kummer proved that if m and n are nonnegative integers and p is a prime number, then the largest power of p dividing  equals pc, where c is the number of carries when m and n are added in base p.
Equivalently, the exponent of a prime p in 
equals the number of nonnegative integers j such that the fractional part of k/pj is greater than the fractional part of n/pj. It can be deduced from this that  is divisible by n/gcd(n,k). In particular therefore it follows that p divides  for all positive integers r and s such that . However this is not true of higher powers of p: for example 9 does not divide .

A somewhat surprising result by David Singmaster (1974) is that any integer divides almost all binomial coefficients. More precisely, fix an integer d and let f(N) denote the number of binomial coefficients  with n < N such that d divides . Then

Since the number of binomial coefficients  with n < N is N(N + 1) / 2, this implies that the density of binomial coefficients divisible by d goes to 1.

Binomial coefficients have divisibility properties related to least common multiples of consecutive integers. For example:

 divides .

Another fact:
An integer  is prime if and only if
all the intermediate binomial coefficients
 
are divisible by n.

Proof:
When p is prime, p divides
 for all 
because  is a natural number and p divides the numerator but not the denominator.
When n is composite, let p be the smallest prime factor of n and let . Then  and

But n is divisible by p, so p does not divide  and because p is prime, we know that p does not divide  and so the numerator cannot be divisible by n.

Bounds and asymptotic formulas 
The following bounds for  hold for all values of n and k such that :

The first inequality follows from the fact that

A similar argument can be made to show the second inequality.

From the divisibility properties we can infer that

where both equalities can be achieved.

The following bounds are useful in information theory:

where  is the binary entropy function. It can be further tightened to

for all .

Both  and  large 
Stirling's approximation yields the following approximation, valid when  both tend to infinity:

Because the inequality forms of Stirling's formula also bound the factorials, slight variants on the above asymptotic approximation give exact bounds.
In particular, when  is sufficiently large, one has
 and 

If n is large and k is linear in n, various precise asymptotic estimates exist for the binomial coefficient . For example, if  then

where d = n − 2k.

much larger than  

where again  is the little o notation.

Sums of binomial coefficients
A simple and rough upper bound for the sum of binomial coefficients can be obtained using the binomial theorem:

More precise bounds are given by

Generalized binomial coefficients 
The infinite product formula for the gamma function also gives an expression for binomial coefficients

which yields the asymptotic formulas

This asymptotic behaviour is contained in the approximation

as well.

Further, the asymptotic formula

Generalizations

Generalization to multinomials

Binomial coefficients can be generalized to multinomial coefficients defined to be the number:

where

While the binomial coefficients represent the coefficients of (x+y)n, the multinomial coefficients
represent the coefficients of the polynomial

The case r = 2 gives binomial coefficients:

The combinatorial interpretation of multinomial coefficients is distribution of n distinguishable elements over r (distinguishable) containers, each containing exactly ki elements, where i is the index of the container.

Multinomial coefficients have many properties similar to those of binomial coefficients, for example the recurrence relation:

and symmetry:

where  is a permutation of (1, 2, ..., r).

Taylor series 
Using Stirling numbers of the first kind the series expansion around any arbitrarily chosen point  is

Binomial coefficient with  

In particular, the following identity holds for any non-negative integer :

This shows up when expanding  into a power series using the Newton binomial series :

Products of binomial coefficients 
One can express the product of two binomial coefficients as a linear combination of binomial coefficients:

where the connection coefficients are multinomial coefficients. In terms of labelled combinatorial objects, the connection coefficients represent the number of ways to assign  labels to a pair of labelled combinatorial objects—of weight m and n respectively—that have had their first k labels identified, or glued together to get a new labelled combinatorial object of weight . (That is, to separate the labels into three portions to apply to the glued part, the unglued part of the first object, and the unglued part of the second object.) In this regard, binomial coefficients are to exponential generating series what falling factorials are to ordinary generating series.

The product of all binomial coefficients in the nth row of the Pascal triangle is given by the formula:

Partial fraction decomposition 
The partial fraction decomposition of the reciprocal is given by

Newton's binomial series 

Newton's binomial series, named after Sir Isaac Newton, is a generalization of the binomial theorem to infinite series:

The identity can be obtained by showing that both sides satisfy the differential equation {{math|1=(1 + z) f'''(z) = α f(z)}}.

The radius of convergence of this series is 1. An alternative expression is

where the identity

is applied.

 Multiset (rising) binomial coefficient 

Binomial coefficients count subsets of prescribed size from a given set. A related combinatorial problem is to count multisets of prescribed size with elements drawn from a given set, that is, to count the number of ways to select a certain number of elements from a given set with the possibility of selecting the same element repeatedly. The resulting numbers are called multiset coefficients; the number of ways to "multichoose" (i.e., choose with replacement) k items from an n element set is denoted .

Multiset coefficients may be expressed in terms of binomial coefficients by the rule

One possible alternative characterization of this identity is as follows:
We may define the falling factorial as

and the corresponding rising factorial as

so, for example,

Then the binomial coefficients may be written as

while the corresponding multiset coefficient is defined by replacing the falling with the rising factorial:

 Generalization to negative integers n 

For any n,

In particular, binomial coefficients evaluated at negative integers n are given by signed multiset coefficients. In the special case , this reduces to 

For example, if n = −4 and k = 7, then r = 4 and f = 10:

 Two real or complex valued arguments 
The binomial coefficient is generalized to two real or complex valued arguments using the gamma function or beta function via

This definition inherits these following additional properties from :

moreover,

Notably, many binomial identities fail:  but  for n positive (so  negative). The behavior is quite complex, and markedly different in various octants (that is, with respect to the x and y axes and the line ), with the behavior for negative x having singularities at negative integer values and a checkerboard of positive and negative regions:
 in the octant  it is a smoothly interpolated form of the usual binomial, with a ridge ("Pascal's ridge").
 in the octant  and in the quadrant  the function is close to zero.
 in the quadrant  the function is alternatingly very large positive and negative on the parallelograms with vertices 
 in the octant  the behavior is again alternatingly very large positive and negative, but on a square grid.
 in the octant  it is close to zero, except for near the singularities.

 Generalization to q-series 
The binomial coefficient has a q-analog generalization known as the Gaussian binomial coefficient.

 Generalization to infinite cardinals 
The definition of the binomial coefficient can be generalized to infinite cardinals by defining:

where A is some set with cardinality . One can show that the generalized binomial coefficient is well-defined, in the sense that no matter what set we choose to represent the cardinal number ,  will remain the same. For finite cardinals, this definition coincides with the standard definition of the binomial coefficient.

Assuming the Axiom of Choice, one can show that  for any infinite cardinal .

In programming languages
The notation  is convenient in handwriting but inconvenient for typewriters and computer terminals. Many programming languages do not offer a standard subroutine for computing the binomial coefficient, but for example both the APL programming language and the (related) J programming language use the exclamation mark: k ! n. The binomial coefficient is implemented in SciPy as scipy.special.comb.

Naive implementations of the factorial formula, such as the following snippet in Python:
from math import factorial
def binomial_coefficient(n: int, k: int) -> int:
    return factorial(n) // (factorial(k) * factorial(n - k))

are very slow and are useless for calculating factorials of very high numbers (in languages such as C or Java they suffer from overflow errors because of this reason). A direct implementation of the multiplicative formula works well:

def binomial_coefficient(n: int, k: int) -> int:
    if k < 0 or k > n:
        return 0
    if k == 0 or k == n:
        return 1
    k = min(k, n - k) # Take advantage of symmetry
    c = 1
    for i in range(k):
        c = c * (n - i) // (i + 1)
    return c
(In Python, range(k) produces a list from 0 to k−1.)

Pascal's rule provides a recursive definition which can also be implemented in Python, although it is less efficient:
def binomial_coefficient(n: int, k: int) -> int:
    if k < 0 or k > n:
        return 0
    if k > n - k: # Take advantage of symmetry
        k = n - k
    if k == 0 or n <= 1:
        return 1
    return binomial_coefficient(n - 1, k) + binomial_coefficient(n - 1, k - 1)

The example mentioned above can be also written in functional style. The following Scheme example uses the recursive definition

Rational arithmetic can be easily avoided using integer division

The following implementation uses all these ideas
(define (binomial n k)
;; Helper function to compute C(n,k) via forward recursion
  (define (binomial-iter n k i prev)
    (if (>= i k)
      prev
     (binomial-iter n k (+ i 1) (/ (* (- n i) prev) (+ i 1)))))
;; Use symmetry property C(n,k)=C(n, n-k)
  (if (< k (- n k))
    (binomial-iter n k 0 1)
    (binomial-iter n (- n k) 0 1)))

When computing  in a language with fixed-length integers, the multiplication by  may overflow even when the result would fit. The overflow can be avoided by dividing first and fixing the result using the remainder:

Implementation in the C language:

#include <limits.h>

unsigned long binomial(unsigned long n, unsigned long k) {
  unsigned long c = 1, i;

  if (k > n-k) // take advantage of symmetry
    k = n-k;

  for (i = 1; i <= k; i++, n--) {
    if (c/i > ULONG_MAX/n) // return 0 on potential overflow
      return 0;

    c = c / i * n + c % i * n / i; // split c * n / i into (c / i * i + c % i) * n / i
  }

  return c;
}
Another way to compute the binomial coefficient when using large numbers is to recognize that

It is a special function that is easily computed and is standard in some programming languages such as using log_gamma in Maxima, LogGamma in Mathematica, gammaln in MATLAB and Python's SciPy module, lngamma in PARI/GP or lgamma'' in C, R, and Julia. Roundoff error may cause the returned value to not be an integer.

See also

 Binomial transform
 Delannoy number
 Eulerian number
 Hypergeometric function
 List of factorial and binomial topics
 Macaulay representation of an integer
 Motzkin number
 Multiplicities of entries in Pascal's triangle
 Narayana number
 Star of David theorem
 Sun's curious identity
 Table of Newtonian series
 Trinomial expansion

Notes

References

External links
 
 

Combinatorics
Factorial and binomial topics
Integer sequences
Triangles of numbers
Operations on numbers
Articles with example Python (programming language) code
Articles with example Scheme (programming language) code
Articles with example C code